Hsu Chun-yat or Jack Hsu is a Taiwanese politician. He was the Minister of the Public Construction Commission from July 2014 until May 2016.

Education
Hsu obtained his bachelor's degree in civil engineering from National Cheng Kung University and master's degree in transportation engineering from Asian Institute of Technology in Thailand.

Political career
Prior to his appointment as deputy minister of the Ministry of Transportation and Communications, Hsu was the Director-General of the Railway Reconstruction Bureau of the MOTC on 21 July 2008 until August 2012.

ROC Transportation and Communications Deputy Ministry

Taoyuan International Airport MRT delay

In May 2013, due to the continuing delay of Taoyuan International Airport MRT completion and the resignation of Chu Shu, former Bureau of High Speed Rail director-general, Hsu was assigned to oversee the operation of the bureau.

See also
 Transportation in Taiwan

References

Year of birth missing (living people)
Living people
Asian Institute of Technology alumni
National Cheng Kung University alumni
Taiwanese Ministers of Transportation and Communications